Georg Riesch (born February 26, 1933) is a Swiss former ice hockey player who competed for the Swiss national team at the 1956 Winter Olympics in Cortina d'Ampezzo.

References

External links

1933 births
Living people
Ice hockey players at the 1956 Winter Olympics
Olympic ice hockey players of Switzerland
Swiss ice hockey defencemen